Mayon is a hamlet on the A30 main road north of Sennen in west Cornwall, England.

Much of the land in St Levan belonged to the manor of Mayon and in the early 17th-century the land was divided between six heiresses, one of whom married John St Aubyn.

References

 Mayon cliff 

Hamlets in Cornwall
Sennen